Tempo is a bus rapid transit (BRT) service in Oakland and San Leandro in California. It is operated by AC Transit as Line 1T. The route has dedicated lanes and center-boarding stations along much of the corridor, prepaid fares, signal preemption, and all-door boarding.

Route
The northern terminus of the line is at the Uptown Transit Center, located at the 19th Street/Oakland BART station. The lines continues down Broadway in mixed traffic, passing 12th Street/Oakland City Center BART station before the southbound and northbound routes split at 11th and 12th Streets, respectively. Both directions simultaneously meet at and run on Lake Merritt Boulevard before splitting again to 12th Street and International Boulevard. Southbound buses join International Boulevard at 14th Avenue and begin median running in an exclusive bus lane. Services continue to a station near Fruitvale BART and onward to San Leandro, where operation in mixed traffic resumes and the line continues down Davis Street to terminate at San Leandro BART.

Articulated buses call at specially built high-curbed bus stops at the north and south ends of the line while the majority of International Boulevard stops feature median strip boarding platforms.

History

Planning
A 1993 AC Transit study designed the Berkeley–Oakland–San Leandro corridor as a potential alignment for major transit investment. The agency began work on a Major Investment Study (MIS) for the corridor in 1999. Telegraph Avenue was selected as the Berkeley–Oakland alignment in 2011; Shattuck Avenue had lower expected ridership, while College Avenue had fewer opportunities for transit-oriented development. The 2002-released MIS recommended bus rapid transit (BRT) for the corridor; light rail was deemed not to be cost-effective, while enhancements to conventional bus service would not generate significant ridership increases. 

Prior to 2007, Telegraph Avenue was primarily served by the 40/40L local/limited-stop routes, while International Boulevard and East 14th Street were served by the 82/82L pair. Service changes on June 24, 2007, included the establishment of Berkeley–Downtown Oakland–Bay Fair routes 1R and 1; the 82/82L were discontinued and the 40/40L were cut back to no longer serve Telegraph Avenue. Route 1R (the International Rapid) operated as a limited-stop overlay of local route 1; it had some bus rapid transit features like transit signal priority and wide stop spacing, but not all-door boarding or dedicated lanes. It was intended as a first phase while the full BRT service was planned.

AC Transit later selected a combined service to San Leandro station as the Locally Preferred Alternative. In April 2010, the Berkeley City Council voted against the inclusion of center bus lanes over concerns about reducing Telegraph Avenue to a single general traffic lane in each direction. The city's preferred alternative, with curbside stops and no dedicated bus lanes, was not compatible with BRT service standards. Berkeley withdrew from the project in 2011. San Leandro also objected to center lanes on its portion of the line.

The Final Environmental Impact Statement/Final Environmental Impact Report, released in January 2012, removed the center lanes south of Georgia Way in San Leandro. It also included a Downtown Oakland–San Leandro alternative to allow the project to proceed without the Berkeley and North Oakland section. AC Transit approved this shorter alternative in April 2012, followed by the Oakland and San Leandro city councils that July. (That June, the center lanes had been further cut to Broadmoor Street near the Oakland/San Leandro border by the San Leandro city council.)

Construction

Route 1R was eliminated on June 26, 2016 to allow for construction. Route 1 was changed to run only between Downtown Oakland and San Leandro station; new routes 6 and 10 were created to serve the Downtown Oakland–Berkeley and San Leandro–Bay Fair segments. Groundbreaking was held in August 2016. The project was funded by a mix of local, state, and federal funds; major sources included Federal Transit Administration Small Starts (31%), Regional Measure 2 bridge tolls (24%), AC Transit (10%), and Alameda County Measure B/Measure BB sales tax (9.2%).

The service was branded Tempo in July 2020, with the service numbered 1T. Route 1T service began on August 9, 2020, with local route 1 eliminated. Tempo was fare-free for the first 90 days of service; fare collection started on November 9, 2020. The total cost of the project was $232 million.

A 2016 AC Transit study of potential improvements to major corridors proposed extensions of the Downtown Oakland–San Leandro corridor to Emeryville via West Grand Avenue, and to Bay Fair station via East 14th Street.

References

External links

Tempo site at AC Transit

Bus rapid transit in California
Public transportation in Alameda County, California
Transportation in Oakland, California
San Leandro, California
2020 establishments in California
Transport infrastructure completed in 2020